Wee Kheng Ming, also known as Huang Qi Ming, is a Malaysian actor and singer. Wee used to work in the tourism industry before going into showbiz. He started out in showbiz as a singer and TV host.

Although fairly new to acting at that time, Wee was given his first lead role in The Thin Line in which he played one of the three main characters. He was nominated for the Best Actor Award at the 2010 Golden Awards.

Filmography

References

External links
Official Facebook page

21st-century Malaysian male actors
Malaysian people of Chinese descent
People from Sarawak
Malaysian male film actors
1974 births
Living people